Walter James Beavers (11 July 1903 – 29 November 1965) was an English athlete who competed for Great Britain in the 1928 Summer Olympics.

He was born and died in York.

In 1928 he finished ninth in the 10,000 metres event. In the 5,000 metres competition he was eliminated in the first round.

At the 1934 Empire Games he won the gold medal in the 3 miles contest.

References

1903 births
1965 deaths
Sportspeople from York
English male long-distance runners
Olympic athletes of Great Britain
Athletes (track and field) at the 1928 Summer Olympics
Athletes (track and field) at the 1934 British Empire Games
Commonwealth Games gold medallists for England
Commonwealth Games medallists in athletics
Medallists at the 1934 British Empire Games